Kazanka settlement hromada is a hromada (territorial community) in Ukraine, in Bashtanka Raion of Mykolaiv Oblast. The administrative center is the urban-type settlement of Kazanka. Population: 

From its inception until 18 July 2020, Kazanka settlement hromada was located in Kazanka Raion. The raion was abolished in July 2020 as part of the administrative reform of Ukraine, which reduced the number of raions of Mykolaiv Oblast to four.

References 

Hromadas of Mykolaiv Oblast
2017 establishments in Ukraine